Bandiyod is a small town in the Kasaragod district of Kerala, India. It is located midway between Mangalore and Kasaragod.

Transportation
Local roads have access to National Highway No.66 which connects to Mangalore in the north and Calicut in the south.  The nearest railway station is Kumbla on Mangalore-Palakkad line. There is an airport at Mangalore.

Languages
This locality is an essentially multi-lingual region. The people speak Malayalam, Tulu, Urdu, Beary, Kannada and Konkani. Migrant workers also speak Hindi and Tamil languages. This village is part of Manjeswaram assembly constituency which is again part of Kasaragod (Lok Sabha constituency).

Health
Nisha Hospital
DM Health Centre
Ayu Sagar Ayurvedic Hospital
Afia Clinic
Doctors Lab
shettys clinic

Image gallery

References

Manjeshwar area